Ctenucha biformis is a moth of the family Erebidae. It is found in Peru and Bolivia.

References

biformis
Moths described in 1907